"Pins and Needles" is a single by New Zealand rock band Opshop. It was released in April 2010, and charted on the New Zealand Singles Chart at number 20. The post-apocalyptic themed video was filmed using blue-screen technology.

References

2010 singles
Opshop songs
2010 songs